Chin Jossue Hormechea Hoy (born 12 May 1996) is a Panamanian footballer who currently plays at Sporting San Miguelito.

International career
Hormechea played at the 2013 FIFA U-17 World Cup in the United Arab Emirates and the 2015 FIFA U-20 World Cup in New Zealand.

He made his senior debut for Panama in a February 2015 friendly match against the United States.

Honours 
Panama U20
 CONCACAF U-20 Championship Runners-up: 2015

References

External links 

1996 births
Living people
Association football defenders
Panamanian footballers
Panama international footballers
2015 CONCACAF U-20 Championship players
C.D. Árabe Unido players
Sporting San Miguelito players
Liga Panameña de Fútbol players